Curtis in Chicago is a 1973 live album by Curtis Mayfield and others. Mayfield is joined by The Impressions, Jerry Butler, Gene Chandler and others in a review of Mayfield's then-fifteen years as a recording artist.

Track listing 
All tracks written and composed by Curtis Mayfield unless otherwise noted.
 "Superfly" - Curtis Mayfield
 "For Your Precious Love" (Arthur Brooks, Richard Brooks, Jerry Butler) - Curtis Mayfield, Jerry Butler and The Impressions
 "I'm So Proud" - The Impressions
 "For Once in My Life" (Orlando Murden, Ronald Miller) - The Impressions
 "Preacher Man" - The Impressions
 "If I Were Only a Child Again" - Curtis Mayfield
 "Duke of Earl" (Gene Chandler, Earl Edwards, Bernice Williams) - Gene Chandler
 "Love Oh Love"  (Janice Hutson, Leroy Hutson, Michael Hawkins) - Leroy Hutson
 "Amen" (Mayfield, Johnny Pate) - Curtis Mayfield, Gene Chandler, Leroy Hutson and The Impressions

References

Curtis Mayfield live albums
1973 live albums
Curtom Records live albums